Singjamei (Vidhan Sabha constituency) is one of the 60 constituencies in the Manipur Legislative Assembly of Manipur, a north-eastern state of India. Singjamei is also part of Inner Manipur Lok Sabha constituency.

Members of Legislative Assembly

Election results

2017

See also
 Singjamei
 Imphal
 List of constituencies of Manipur Legislative Assembly
 Imphal West district

References

External links
 

Assembly constituencies of Manipur
Imphal